Sir William Gordon Fry (12 June 1909  – 29 September 2000) was an Australian politician.

He was born in Ballarat to engineer Alfred Gordon Fry and Edith Elizabeth Andrews. He attended state schools at Ballarat before studying at Melbourne University and becoming a schoolteacher. On 19 September 1936 he married Lilian Gwendoline Macrae, with whom he had four sons.

From 1940 to 1945 he served in the Australian Imperial Force, commanding the 47th Battalion in New Guinea and the Solomon Islands. He attained the rank of lieutenant-colonel and was mentioned in dispatches, and subsequently headed a commission investigating war crimes in the Pacific.

On his return he taught at Camperdown State School from 1946 to 1956, and was subsequently headmaster of Cheltenham, Windsor and Cheltenham Heights state schools.

He had joined the Liberal Party in 1947, and from 1963 to 1972 served on Moorabbin City Council; he was mayor from 1968 to 1969. In 1967 he was elected to the Victorian Legislative Council for Higinbotham Province. He was elected President of the Council in 1976, and retired from politics in 1979; he was knighted the following year, by which time he was living in Beaumaris.

Fry died at Richmond in 2000.

The Sir William Fry Reserve is an area of parkland named after him in 1985. It is located near the intersection of Nepean Highway and Bay Road in the Melbourne suburb of Highett.

References

1909 births
2000 deaths
Liberal Party of Australia members of the Parliament of Victoria
Members of the Victorian Legislative Council
Presidents of the Victorian Legislative Council
Australian Knights Bachelor
Australian colonels
Australian Army personnel of World War II
20th-century Australian politicians
People from Ballarat